Alisha Ilhaan Bø (born March 6, 1997), known professionally as Alisha Boe, is a United States–based actress. She is known for playing Jessica Davis in the Netflix drama series 13 Reasons Why.

Early life
Boe was born in Oslo, Norway, to a Somali father and a Norwegian mother (from Trondheim). She and her mother moved to Los Angeles when Alisha was seven years old because her mother remarried. Boe attended El Camino Real High School, where she was involved in the drama program. After graduation, she pursued her acting career, whereupon she became the first actress of Somali origin to hold a leading role in an American film since Iman.

Career
Boe made her acting debut in 2008, when she landed a role of a young Lisa Swan in the horror film Amusement. A year later, she appeared in the film He's On My Mind, and in the 2012 horror film Paranormal Activity 4. In 2014, she guest-starred in Modern Family and two episodes of Extant.

In November 2014, she joined the cast of NBC's soap opera Days of Our Lives in the recurring role of Daphne. From 2017 to 2020, she portrayed the role of Jessica Davis in the Netflix original drama series 13 Reasons Why.

In January 2021, Boe joined the cast of Jesse Eisenberg's feature film directorial debut When You Finish Saving the World.

Filmography

Film

Television

Music videos

References

External links
 

1997 births
Living people
Norwegian people of Somali descent
Norwegian emigrants to the United States
21st-century Norwegian actresses
El Camino Real High School alumni